John B. Goulandris  (1930 - 2016) was a Greek shipowner.

John B. Goulandris was the eldest of five brothers, George, twins Nicholas "Nikos" and Vassilis "Basil" Goulandris, and Constantine.

In 2009, he was living in London and the Sunday Times Rich List estimated his net worth at £200 million.

He was the vice–chairman of the Union of Greek Shipowners.

He was married to Maria Lemos. Their daughter, Chryss Goulandris is married to the Irish billionaire Sir Tony O'Reilly.

He died in 2016, and was buried in Andros.

References

2016 deaths
John
Greek businesspeople in shipping
1930 births